Below are the list of Upin & Ipin episodes.

Series overview

Episode list

Upin & Ipin (2007)

Upin & Ipin: Setahun Kemudian (One Year Later)

Upin & Ipin (2008)

Upin & Ipin dan Kawan-Kawan (2009-2011)

Season 3 (2009)

Season 4 (2010)

Season 5 (2011)

Upin & Ipin (2012-present)

Season 6 (2012)

Season 7 (2013)

Season 8 (2014)

Season 9 (2015)

Season 10 (2016)

Season 11 (2017)

Season 12 (2018)

Season 13 (2019)

Season 14 (2020-21)

Season 15 (2021-22)

Season 16 (2022-23)

References

Lists of Malaysian animated television series episodes